Zofenoprilat is an angiotensin-converting enzyme inhibitor and is the free sulfhydryl active metabolite of zofenopril.

References

Agents acting on the renin-angiotensin system
Thiols
Human drug metabolites
Carboxylic acids